"What If It's You" is a song written by Robert Ellis Orrall and Cathy Majeski and recorded by American country music artist Reba McEntire. It was released on September 6, 1997 as the fourth and final single and title track from the album What If It's You. It reached #15 on the Billboard Hot Country Singles & Tracks chart.

Chart performance

References

1997 singles
Reba McEntire songs
Songs written by Robert Ellis Orrall
MCA Records singles
Songs written by Cathy Majeski
1996 songs